Charles Dow Richards (June 12, 1879 – September 15, 1956), was a Canadian lawyer, judge and politician. He served as the 20th premier of New Brunswick from 1931 to 1933.

Early life and education
Richards was born in Southampton, New Brunswick. He attended Fredericton Normal School and later the University of New Brunswick.

Career
Richards taught school for several years. He was admitted to the bar at age 33. and practised law in Fredericton.

Richards was elected to the New Brunswick legislature in 1920. He served as Conservative house leader and then Minister of Lands and Mines under Premier John B. M. Baxter. In 1928 the University of New Brunswick conferred on him an honorary Doctor of Laws degree.

In 1931 Richards became premier of New Brunswick. His two-year administration, in the depths of the Great Depression, instituted public bidding on crown land and fishing rights.  In 1933 he left politics when he was appointed to the Supreme Court of New Brunswick, serving as its Chief Justice from 1946 to 1955.

As Justice, Richards sentenced the last man to be executed in Charlotte County. He did not accept the jury's request "that mercy be shown to the accused," 22-year-old Thomas Roland Hutchings, and sentenced him to hang at St. Andrews, New Brunswick on Wednesday, December 16, 1942, for the rape and murder of Bernice Connors.

Personal life
Richards married Grace Bolton. The couple had one daughter, who married a descendant of Philemon Wright.

Richards died in 1956 and was buried in the Forest Hill Cemetery in Fredericton.

References

External links
 Government of New Brunswick biography (pdf)

1879 births
1956 deaths
University of New Brunswick alumni
Lawyers in New Brunswick
Judges in New Brunswick
Premiers of New Brunswick
People from York County, New Brunswick